Dayton was a post-disco funk band, formed in Dayton, Ohio, United States by Chris Jones (trumpet, keyboards, vocals) from the band Sun and Shawn Sandridge (guitar, vocals) from Over Night Low.  Derrick Armstrong (vocals), Kevin Hurt (drums, percussion), Jenny Douglas (vocals) and Rachel Beavers (vocals) completed the line up. Former Sun member Dean Hummons played the keyboards on the first two Dayton albums.

Biography
The group signed to Liberty Records in 1980 and released their self-titled debut album which included the track "Eyes on You". Dayton toured with Ashford & Simpson, Quincy Jones and Stephanie Mills. They recorded a second Liberty album, Cutie Pie, in 1981. Guest musicians included James "Diamond" Williams, Keith Harrison, Clarence "Chet" Willis, Billy Beck, Wes Boatman and Vincent Andrews.

The group switched to Capitol Records in 1982 and delivered the successful album Hot Fun. This record included "Krackity-Krack" with a guest appearance by Bootsy Collins and their hit cover version of Sly Stone's "Hot Fun in the Summertime". 

Dayton introduced Rahni Harris as vocalist/keyboard player on their fourth album, Feel the Music in 1983, which included "The Sound of Music". "The Sound of Music" recorded on Capitol (CL318) Records was their best known track in the UK, where it reached No.75 in the UK Singles Chart for one week in late 1983. It became very popular in nightclubs throughout the UK. The song "Love You Anyway" was produced by Zapp’s Roger Troutman. Harris did most of the songwriting and production. 

They released their last album This Time in 1985, also produced by Harris. The single "You Should Be Dancin'" was released from this LP (the last track on side 2) but failed to chart in the UK. The album did not match their previous efforts and marked the end of Dayton.

Discography

Albums
1980: Dayton (Liberty)
1981: Cutie Pie (Liberty)
1982: Hot Fun (Capitol)
1983: Feel the Music (Capitol)
1985: This Time (Capitol)

Singles

References

External links
 Dayton discography at Discogs.
 [ Dayton discography] on Allmusic

American boogie musicians
Funk musical groups from Dayton, Ohio